The 1920–21 Bradford City A.F.C. season was the 14th in the club's history.

The club finished 15th in Division One, and reached the 2nd round of the FA Cup.

Sources

References

Bradford City A.F.C. seasons
Bradford City